Iolaus maritimus, the coastal sapphire, is a butterfly in the family Lycaenidae. It is found in Kenya and Tanzania. The habitat consists of coastal and subcoastal forests.

The larvae feed on Erianthemum schelei, Phragmanthera usuiensis sigensis, Oedina pendens and Oedina congdoniana.

Subspecies
Iolaus maritimus maritimus (coast of Kenya)
Iolaus maritimus usambara (Stempffer, 1961) (Tanzania: north-east to the Usambara Mountains)

References

Butterflies described in 1958
Iolaus (butterfly)